First grade (also called Grade One, called Year 2 in England or Primary 2 in Scotland) is the first grade in elementary school and the first school year after kindergarten. Children are usually 6–7 years old in this grade.

Examples by region

Asia 

In Israel, children enter the first grade (kita aleph) the year they turn six or seven.
In Singapore, First Grade (or more commonly, "Primary 1"), begins when a child is six years old. Child at least 6 years old on 1 January of a given year gain admission to P1.
In Bahrain, the minimum age for the first grade is seven years old.
In Bangladesh, First Grade (known as prothom sreni) begins in January when a student is six years old.
In Sri Lanka, children enter Class 1 or 2 when they are six or seven years old.
In Malaysia's education system, First Grade (or most commonly, Standard or Year 1) begins at the age of seven.
In India, children start school at age five.
In Iran, children start school at age seven.
In the Philippines, Grade 1 is the first year of Primary Level and Elementary School curriculum. Students are usually 6–7 years old.

Europe 
 In Belgium, children aged 6 or 7 years old enter into  (French Community) or "" (Flemish Community) (first year of elementary education).
In Bulgaria, the minimum age for first graders is 6 years old. The Bulgarian term is '' (purvi klas), 'first class'.
In the Czech Republic, children aged 6 to 7 years old enter the first year of elementary school.
In Finland, children are aged 6 to 7 at the beginning of this grade. Before first grade, children attend pre-school (first year after kindergarten) at age 5-6.
In Greece, children are six years old at the bginning of first grade. The first school year of primary education is referred to as First Grade of Primary.
In Iceland, children enter the first grade (1.bekk) the year they turn six.
Students are usually 6–7 years old at this level, and it serves as the 3rd year of primary school.
In the Netherlands, first grade corresponds to Group 3, the third year of primary education.
In Norway, children enter the first grade the year they turn six.
In Poland children enter their first year of school aged seven (from 2012 to 2016 the entry age was six; prior thereto, it was also seven).
In Portugal, children enter their first year of school aged five or six.
In Russia, children aged 6 to 8 years old enter  (pervyy klass, first grade).
In Slovenia, children are aged 5 years and 8 months to 6 years and 8 months at the beginning of this grade.
In Sweden, children are 7 years old when entering first grade, and 6 years old when beginning "", the first year after kindergarten.
In Spain, children are five to six years old when they enter the first year of elementary school.
In Ukraine, children aged six to seven years old enter  (pershyy klas, first grade).

United Kingdom 
In England and Wales, the first year of primary school is called reception, with pupils 4 to 5 years old. However, the first compulsory school year is Year One, when children are five. As most primary schools have a reception class which is treated like a compulsory school year, i.e. the children wear a uniform and have the same school hours, most children start school in reception. The first grade is the equivalent of Year Two.

Scottish pupils usually enter the corresponding stage one year younger. In Northern Ireland. they are two years younger. In Scotland, first grade is equivalent to Primary 3. Pupils in Primary 3 are 7 to 8 years old. Scotland calls these grades primary school, as Primary 1 starts after kindergarten (nursery school) at 4 to 5 years of age. Primary school continues through Primary 6.

North America

Canada

United States

In arithmetic, students learn about addition and subtraction of natural or whole numbers, usually with only one digit or two digits, and about measurement. Basic geometry and graphing may sometimes be introduced. Clock and calendar time, as well as money, may also be in the curriculum.

In language arts, first graders are taught the fundamentals of literacy, including reading sentences, writing very simple statements, and mastery of the alphabet, building on what they have learned in kindergarten or other forms of pre-school. Expectations for first grade have changed due to Common Core Standards. The curriculum is typically based on standards developed by educators in each state. Most states use the Common Core Standards, so most schools across the country use similar curricula. First graders are expected to read and comprehend stories ranging in length and difficulty. They are also expected to show an improved fluency rate during the school year, with the ability to easily read stories by the end of the year.

Students are also typically introduced to the concept of social studies, with an emphasis on establishing ideas of history or civics in either a personal or larger sense. Some states focus on the basics of US history and patriotism, with a focus on the Founding Fathers and the time period surrounding the American Revolution; other states require social studies focus on family relationships in first grade, leaving community, state, and national studies to higher grades. Basic geography is also taught in the first grade. Focus on the school's municipal area and culture, along with basic state geography, is also be focused upon in first grade in some states. First-grade science classes usually involve the discussion of matter, plant and animal science, earth materials, and balance and motion, along with the human body and basic health and nutrition.

Science as inquiry is taught and practiced in first grade classes. Students are encouraged to observe the world around them and begin asking questions about things they notice.

Africa 

In Sudan, children usually start grade 1 at the age of 6 or 7.
In South Africa, children start grade 1 at the age of 6 or 7, depending on their curriculum (whether CAPS or Cambridge schooling system, etc).

Oceania 

In some states in Australia, first grade is called Year 1. It is the second year of school after Kindergarten (called Prep in some states), and children are usually between 6 and 7 years old when entering.

In New Zealand, first grade is called "Year 2." Children generally start this level when they are 6 or 7 years old.

South America 
In Brazil, first grade is the primeiro ano do Ensino Fundamental I. That is, the minimum age for first grade was changed from 7 (84 months) to 6 years (72 months) when the "alphabetization" grade, called simply Alfabetização (literacy), was renamed first grade, with all following grades renamed as well. All students must be 6 years old before an assigned cut-off date.

In Uruguay, first graders are usually six years old. However, regulations stipulate that students must be six years old before April 30 in that given year.

See also 
 Educational stage

References 

1
Primary education